Guru Pournima is an Indian Marathi language film directed by Girish Mohite and produced by Meghana Manoj Caculo. The film stars Sai Tamhankar, Upendra Limaye and Sulabha Arya. The film was released on 12 September 2014.

Synopsis 
Guru Pournima revolves around a love story of a creative director Guru and a struggling actress Pournima, who is ambitious and leaves her parents and family to pursue her acting career.

Cast 
 Sai Tamhankar double role as Pournima. aka Akanksha
 Upendra Limaye as Guru
 Sulabha Arya as Guru’s mother
 Vidhita Kale
 Rajiv Hede
 Sushant

Soundtrack

Critical response
Guru Pournima received mixed reviews from critics. Mihir Bhanage of The Times of India rated the film 3 out of 5 stars and wrote "Girish Mohite’s tale is as closely knit as relations should be and in portraying the importance of those, he has come out with flying colours". Ganesh Matkari of Pune Mirror wrote "Everyone including Sulabha Arya, who plays Guru’s mother, has performed admirably. The film looks good and works well in parts. Still, it lacks the overall punch". Paloma Sharma of Rediff rated the film 3 out of 5 stars and wrote " It is an engaging, sensitive and not frills film that deserves at least one watch". Soumitra Pote of Maharashtra Times rated the film 2.5 out of 5 stars and wrote "Overall, it is true that the student has passed. But, there is no situation to beat the marks obtained". A reviewer from Loksatta wrote "The twists required in a love story do not come here. So, if the good acting of the actors is omitted, the film falls short in reaching the audience".

References

External links
 
 

2014 films
2010s Marathi-language films
Indian drama films
Indian romance films